Save Ralph is a stop motion mockumentary animated short film written and directed by Spencer Susser. It stars Taika Waititi, Ricky Gervais, Zac Efron, Olivia Munn, Pom Klementieff, Tricia Helfer, and Rodrigo Santoro. The plot follows an interview with Ralph (Waititi), a rabbit who details his life as he is used for animal testing and the damages it has caused to his body. Produced by Jeff Vespa, the 4-minute short film was released by Humane Society International on April 6, 2021, to critical acclaim.

Plot
Ralph is a rabbit. Speaking with Humane Society International for a documentary, he talks about his life as a "tester" for cosmetic products. Ralph tells the production crew how he is blind in one eye and partially deaf. While preparing for work, Ralph explains with a sad tone how he does not necessarily care about his life, as he feels sacrificing his body to help humans is worth it. At a laboratory, Ralph's rabbit friends beg for the production crew to free them from their trials as Ralph is injected with an unknown chemical into his only working eye. Now completely blind and visibly in pain, Ralph says his final remarks; without animal testing, he would be out in a field "like a normal rabbit". As the video ends, Ralph gives a worried thumbs-up towards the camera, claiming "It's all good".

Voice cast

 Taika Waititi as Ralph, a rabbit
 Ricky Gervais as the interviewer
 Zac Efron as Bobby, a rabbit
 Olivia Munn as Marshmallow, a rabbit
 Pom Klementieff as Cinnamon, a rabbit
 Tricia Helfer as Cottonballs, a rabbit
 Rodrigo Santoro as a rabbit

In the Spanish and French dubs, George Lopez and Pom Klementieff lend their voices as Ralph respectively. Additionally, Santoro, Wilmer Valderrama, Denis Villeneuve, and Rosario Dawson also appear in the Portuguese, Spanish, French, and Vietnamese iterations.

Production
The animated project Save Ralph was announced on March 24, 2021, "conceived as part of the #SaveRalph campaign", in an effort from Humane Society International to ban animal testing around the world. That same day, a teaser video for the short film was released, with actor Taika Waititi sharing the official promotional poster for the film and writing on Twitter that the project was "a cool thing that is coming soon. If you don't watch it and love it then you hate animals and we can't be friends anymore. #SaveRalph".

The models of each character were hand-made and created by puppet maker Andy Gent from Arch Model Studio, who said that the process of creating Ralph took over four months and covering him in fur took five weeks. On producing the short film, Jeff Vespa said he wanted to create a project where people would want to watch and learn about the dangers of animal testing, deciding an animated film would be the best approach. In casting an actor to portray Ralph, Spencer said the first person he contacted was Waititi, who quickly agreed to star. Filming for the short took place over 50 days, with each day accounting for the making of approximately four seconds of the film.

Reception
Upon its release, Save Ralph was met with critical acclaim. From /Film, Ben Pearson praised the high level of detail in the short and compared the characters' designs to those in the 2009 film Fantastic Mr. Fox, writing that the film was "disturbing and heartbreaking and manipulative and powerful, all at the same time." Josh Weiss, writing for Syfy Wire, gave positive remarks to the voice acting and humor, stating that "Waititi once again proves that he is among the most prolific entertainers working today". For Animation Magazine, Mercedes Milligan complimented the story's main message and referred to the short itself as "powerful".

References

External links
 
 

2020s stop-motion animated films
Animated films about rabbits and hares
Films about animal rights
Films about animal testing
Films about animal cruelty
Stop-motion animated short films
2020s English-language films
Films directed by Spencer Susser
2020s mockumentary films
Annie Award winners